Saint-Hilaire-Peyroux is a commune in the Corrèze department in central France. Aubazine-Saint-Hilaire station has rail connections to Brive-la-Gaillarde, Ussel, Tulle and Bordeaux.

Population

See also
Communes of the Corrèze department

References

Communes of Corrèze